Vladimir Aleksandrovich Tolmachyov (born 22 May 1996) is a Russian football player.

Club career
He made his debut in the Russian Football National League for FC Baikal Irkutsk on 12 March 2016 in a game against FC Yenisey Krasnoyarsk.

References

External links
 
 Profile by Russian Football National League

1996 births
Sportspeople from Irkutsk
Living people
Russian footballers
Association football midfielders
FC Baikal Irkutsk players
FC Sakhalin Yuzhno-Sakhalinsk players
FC Mashuk-KMV Pyatigorsk players